The Council for the Indian School Certificate Examinations (CISCE) is a semi gov-para privately held national-level board of school education in India that conducts the Indian Certificate of Secondary Education (ICSE) Examination for Class X and the Indian School Certificate (ISC) for Class XII. It was established in 1958. Over 2,300 schools in India and abroad are affiliated to the CISCE. It is also recognised as a 'Non-Governmental National Board of Secondary Education'. 

This Indian Council was set up on the grounds that a board was required to administer the examinations being conducted in India by the University of Cambridge and to optimally tailor them according to the nation's need. The future education policies were prepared under the aegis of the Cambridge University. 

The National Admissions and Accreditation agency of the UK, UCAS (Universities and College Admission Services) recognizes ISCE at par with the Higher School qualification of University of Scotland.
ICSE (Indian Certificate of Secondary Education) is known for its comprehensive syllabus and primarily focus on English language and variety of subjects that it offers involving language, arts, commerce and science. ICSE is primarily taught in English, as a result of which an ICSE student gains greater command over the English language and literature compared to their peers, which helps the students to acquire the art of writing succinctly in English.This makes it easy for those who have passed the ICSE examination to score well in competitive language exams like IELTS and the TOEFL. 
ICSE has always been regarded as one of the best educational board in the world in terms of their rigorous syllabus, tough marking scheme for examinations, progressive evaluation and promotion criteria. In India, several of the top schools are affiliated to ICSE board like Sherwood College-Nanital, Doon School-Dehradun, Mayo Girl's College-Ajmer, La Martiniere College-Lucknow and many More.

Derozio Award
The Derozio Award is an annual prize awarded to the top Indian educationists by the Council for the Indian School Certificate Examinations. It was instituted in 1999 in memory of Henry Louis Vivian Derozio, a poet and educator from West Bengal. It is the highest award conferred by the council for contributions in the field of education.

ICSE Examination

ISC Examination
2022 Statistics

References

External links
 

Organisations based in Delhi
School boards in India
Educational organisations based in India
School examinations in India
School accreditors
Educational institutions established in 1958
1958 establishments in Delhi